Laren Stover is an American writer.  She is the author of Pluto, Animal Lover (HarperCollins), The Bombshell Manual of Style illustrated by Ruben Toledo (Hyperion, 2001) and Bohemian Manifesto: A Field Guide to Living on the Edge (Bulfinch, 2004).   She won the Dana Award for the short story in 2001. She is the daughter of author Leon Stover.

External links
Stover's Website
 Laren Stover's story, "The Last Geronimo in Guernica
Laren Stover's profile on FiledBy

Review of Pluto, Animal Lover
Laren Stover deconstructs the Bombshell on YouTube.
Meet Ulla: When Bombshells Collide

References

21st-century American novelists
American women novelists
American women short story writers
Living people
21st-century American women writers
21st-century American short story writers
Year of birth missing (living people)